The Nuclear Safety and Control Act (the Act) of Canada replaced the Atomic Energy Control Act of 1946 with new, more effective and explicit legislation to regulate the activities of the Canadian nuclear industry. The Act also provided for the establishment of the Canadian Nuclear Safety Commission (CNSC), which replaced the Atomic Energy Control Board (AECB).

References

External links
 Justice Laws Website

Canadian federal legislation
1997 in Canadian law